Glenea paradiana is a species of beetle in the family Cerambycidae. It was described by Lin and Montreuil in 2009. It is known from Vietnam and Laos.

References

paradiana
Beetles described in 2009